Omar Migineishvili  (born 2 June 1984) is a retired Georgian football player who played as a goalkeeper. His height is 189 cm and he weighs 88 kg. He have also played for the national team of Georgia.

37-year old Migineishvili announced his retirement from football in December 2021.

International career
Omar Migineishvili made his first international appearance on 2 June 2013 against Republic of Ireland at Aviva Stadium.

Honours
Torpedo Kutaisi
Georgian Cup: 2011- Runner-up

Dinamo Tbilisi
Georgian League: 2013–14
Georgian Cup: 2014

References

External links
 

1984 births
Living people
Footballers from Georgia (country)
Georgia (country) international footballers
Association football goalkeepers
FC Samtredia players
FC Torpedo Kutaisi players
FC Dila Gori players
FC Spartaki Tskhinvali players
FC Dinamo Tbilisi players
FC Metalurgi Rustavi players
FC Saburtalo Tbilisi players
Erovnuli Liga players